Pearl Mackie (born 29 May 1987) is a British actress. She is best known for playing Bill Potts in the long-running television series Doctor Who. Mackie is a 2010 graduate of the Bristol Old Vic Theatre School. Her first major television role came in 2014, when she played Anne-Marie Frasier in BBC One soap opera Doctors.

Early life
Mackie grew up in Brixton in south London and is of paternal West Indian and maternal English descent. She is the granddaughter of Philip Mackie, who wrote the screenplay for The Naked Civil Servant. She earned a degree in Drama from the University of Bristol, and speaks English, French and Spanish. During her studies she went to workshops and took part in many extra-curricular plays.

In 2010 she graduated from the Bristol Old Vic Theatre School. In the same year Mackie was nominated for the BBC Carleton Hobbs Award for outstanding duologues in the school play Noughts & Crosses.

Career
Mackie appeared in an early mainstream role as a front of house girl in the 2013 music comedy Svengali. In 2014, Mackie played Anne-Marie Frasier in Doctors and the young computer genius Mia in Crystal Springs at the Park Theatre in London. She could also be seen in the political satire Obama-ology at the Finborough theatre in west London, playing Cece and Caits, two young women finding their voice.

In 2015, she performed in the National Theatre's West End production of The Curious Incident of the Dog in the Night Time. In the same year Mackie appeared in the short film Date Aid by Bond, a satirical public service announcement. Mackie has also worked as an acting tutor for Troupers, a company that teaches theatre skills to children and young people.

On 23 April 2016, it was announced that Mackie would be playing Bill Potts, the companion of The Doctor in the British television series Doctor Who. It was also announced in March 2017 that Bill would be the first openly gay main companion in the series.

After production on Series 10 of Doctor Who had wrapped, Mackie joined a production of Harold Pinter's The Birthday Party as Lulu. The production – costarring Stephen Mangan, Toby Jones, and Zoë Wanamaker – opened in January 2018 at London's Harold Pinter Theatre.

In 2020, she guest starred as Lucy 1 in Friday Night Dinner.

Personal life
On 28 June 2020, Mackie came out as bisexual in an Instagram post. She and her partner Kam Chhokar announced their engagement on 19 January 2022.

Filmography

Film

Television

Radio

Theatre

Audio

Music videos

Commercials

Accolades

Awards 

 2018: Screen Nation Film & TV Awards – Female Performance in TV for Doctor Who

Nominations 
 2010: BBC Carleton Hobbs Awards – Outstanding Duologues for the BOVTS play Noughts & Crosses (shared with Roddy Peters)

 2017: TV Times Awards – Favourite Newcomer for Doctor Who
 2017: Heat's Unmissables Awards – Best Actress for Doctor Who
 2021: Critics' Choice Documentary Awards – Best Narration for The Real Charlie Chaplin
 2022: DIVA Awards – Actor of the Year

Honorable mentions 

 2020: Screen Nation Film & TV Awards – Female Performance in TV for various roles

References

External links

Official site

Living people
21st-century British actresses
Alumni of Bristol Old Vic Theatre School
Alumni of the University of Bristol
British film actresses
British stage actresses
British television actresses
Bisexual actresses
Black British actresses
English people of Jamaican descent
Labour Party (UK) people
LGBT Black British people
English LGBT actors
People from Brixton
Actresses from London
1987 births